Sarah Evans (born 12 April 1991) is an English field hockey player who plays as a midfielder for Surbiton and has represented the England and Great Britain national teams.

Evans was educated at Kingston Grammar School and University of Birmingham .

Club career
She plays club hockey in the Women's England Hockey League Premier Division for Surbiton and she is the First Team Captain.

Evans also played for University of Birmingham from 2009 to 2012.

International career

She made her senior international debut for England v South Africa in the 2013 Women's Hockey Investec Cup, on 4 February 2013.
One year later she made her senior international debut for Great Britain v USA in a test match in San Diego, California, on 10 February 2014.

She was selected to play in the Gold Coast Commonwealth Games in 2018.

She was included in the Great Britain squad for the women's field hockey tournament at the 2020 Summer Olympics, held in July and August 2021. Though designated as a alternate player, due to rule changes caused by the COVID-19 pandemic she was eligible to compete in all matches (unlike previous tournaments, in which alternates could only compete after permanently replacing an injured player). Though Great Britain earned the bronze medal, she did not make an appearance and was therefore ineligible to receive a medal.

References

External links
 
 
 
 

1991 births
Living people
English female field hockey players
Female field hockey midfielders
Olympic field hockey players of Great Britain
Field hockey players at the 2020 Summer Olympics
Commonwealth Games medallists in field hockey
Commonwealth Games bronze medallists for England
Field hockey players at the 2018 Commonwealth Games
People from Wandsworth
People educated at Kingston Grammar School
Surbiton Hockey Club players
Women's England Hockey League players
University of Birmingham Hockey Club players
Medallists at the 2018 Commonwealth Games